"Left Turn Ahead" is the eleventh episode of the second season and twenty-third overall episode of the American television drama series Dexter, which first aired on 9 December 2007 on Showtime in the United States. The episode was written by Scott Buck and Tim Schlattmann, and was directed by Marcos Siega.

Plot

Dexter contemplates admitting to the Bay Harbor Butcher killings. Doakes escapes from his cell but is captured by two drug smugglers. They force him to go back to the cabin and carry the cocaine to their boat.  Dexter shows up while they are at the boat and discovers that Doakes has escaped, but then hears voices coming up the path.  He sees Doakes with the drug dealers and manages to kill them both with the help of Doakes.  He then puts Doakes back into the cage and decides that he is going to turn himself in, but needs one last day to sort his affairs, so he leaves Doakes in the cage with some fruit and water.

The FBI is displeased with the lack of progress in the Bay Harbor Butcher case and assigns a deputy director to take over Lundy's role in the investigation. Angel is arrested for the sexual assault of Lila, who offers to drop the charges if Dexter will resume their relationship. Debra investigates Lila's past with Lundy and discovers she is using an alias, eventually discovering that she is an illegal immigrant by fingerprinting Angel's microwave.  Meanwhile, using Dexter's GPS navigation which she stole from the van while Dexter was taking Rita and the kids out for one last day of freedom, Lila discovers the cabin in the swamp, where Doakes is being held.  La Guerta is in Haiti and finds out that Doakes was there to get slides analyzed.  She calls Lundy and he is interested in getting the details.  Dexter changes his mind on turning himself in after having steaks with his sister who tells him he just needs to accept who he is and move on.

Production
Filming locations for the episode included Palos Verdes Estates, Long Beach, Marina del Rey, and Los Angeles, California.

Reception

The episode was positively received. IGN's Eric Goldman gave the episode a rating of 9 out of 10, and commented that "[y]ou know a show is doing a great job when it has you thinking that maybe they should end it now, simply because it seems so impossible to top what is currently happening. Such is the case with Dexter, where the penultimate episode of the season truly felt like the penultimate episode of the entire series." The A.V. Club critic Scott Tobias gave the episode a B+ grade and stated that "[a]fter the major character revelations last week, "Left Turn Ahead" does a lot of table-setting for next week's big finale, but the plotting is mostly strong (as it's been all season, really) and not entirely at the expense of character, either."

References

External links

 
 "Left Turn Ahead" at Showtime's website

2007 American television episodes
Dexter (TV series) episodes
Television episodes directed by Marcos Siega